Panbeh Kar or Panbehkar may refer to:
Panbeh Kar, Zaz va Mahru, a village in Zaz va Mahru District, Aligudarz County, Lorestan Province, Iran
Panbeh Kar, Pol-e Dokhtar, a village in Pol-e Dokhtar County, Lorestan Province, Iran